The 2001 Wellington City mayoral election was part of the 2001 New Zealand local elections held at that time. Elections were held for the Mayor of Wellington plus other local government roles. Kerry Prendergast, the former deputy mayor, was elected as mayor of Wellington replacing Mark Blumsky who had retired. This was the last Wellington mayoral election that used the First past the post method.

Results

Ward results

Candidates were also elected from wards to the Wellington City Council.

References

External links

Mayoral elections in Wellington
2001 elections in New Zealand
October 2001 events in New Zealand
Politics of the Wellington Region
2000s in Wellington